The M5 is a spur motorway of 1.4 miles (2.3 km) length in north Belfast, Northern Ireland. It connects the M2 to the A2 Shore Road at Hazelbank in Newtownabbey. It is a dual two lane road with most of the road on a causeway in Belfast Lough in order to bypass Whitehouse beach.

History & future development

Originally announced in 1964, the M5 was planned to follow the route of the B90 to Carrickfergus. Under the plans it would also have been the southern terminus of the unbuilt M6 Motorway to Larne. The scale of the scheme was reduced to its present form in the 1969 transport review, but it was recommended that the line of the originally planned route should be protected from development. Opening to traffic on 12 September 1980, the M5 was the only one of Northern Ireland's original motorway schemes to proceed after the cancellation of all the existing motorway plans in 1975 following the deterioration of civil order. The M3 later opened in 1995, and had the same number as the original planned motorway in east Belfast, but was a completely different project.

Culverts were added to ensure that what became Whitehouse Lagoon remained tidal, however these have not worked and the beach has become mud and sludge since the motorway opened. In 2008 the Northern Ireland Executive approved a plan to dual the road from the University of Ulster campus at Jordanstown as far as Carrickfergus, involving the compulsory purchase of twelve houses, a commercial unit and parts of 68 gardens. The dualling was completed in 2013, and left only a two-mile section from Whitehouse through Whiteabbey as single lane road.

Junctions

See also
Roads in Ireland
List of motorways in the United Kingdom

References

External links

CBRD Motorway Database – M5 (Northern Ireland)
Northern Ireland Roads Site – M5
The Motorway Archive – M5 (Northern Ireland)

Motorways in Northern Ireland
Roads in Belfast
Roads in County Antrim